Robert Dougall (21 January 1910 – 26 January 1988) was a Scottish professional footballer. A right half, he played in the English Football League for Blackpool and  Reading. In Scotland he played for Hamilton Academical at the start of his senior career, and later featured as a wartime guest player for Dumbarton and hometown club Falkirk.

References

1910 births
Footballers from Falkirk
Scottish footballers
Hamilton Academical F.C. players
Blackpool F.C. players
Reading F.C. players
Dumbarton F.C. wartime guest players
Falkirk F.C. wartime guest players
1988 deaths
Association football wing halves
English Football League players
Scottish Football League players
Scottish Junior Football Association players